Erick Kabu (born December 21, 1989, in Accra) is a Ghanaian football (soccer) striker who played in the Bulgarian A PFG for Botev Plovdiv.

Career 
Kabu began his career in the youth from Accra Hearts of Oak SC and joined than in summer 2008 to Botev Plovdiv, here played his first professional game in the  TBI A Football Group on 4 October 2008 against OFC Sliven 2000.

Kabu left Botev Plovdiv on 26 January 2010 as the club went bankrupt.

References 

1989 births
Living people
Ghanaian footballers
Expatriate footballers in Bulgaria
Botev Plovdiv players
First Professional Football League (Bulgaria) players
Association football forwards
Ghanaian expatriate sportspeople in Bulgaria
Footballers from Accra